Varanus tsukamotoi, the Mariana monitor or Saipan monitor, is a species of lizard of the Varanidae family. It is endemic to the Northern Mariana Islands and Guam, and has been introduced to Japtan in the Marshall Islands.

Etymology 
It was named by Kyukichi Kishida after Dr. Iwasaburo Tsukamoto, who supported his expedition to the South Pacific. In the Chamorro language, it is known as hilitai.

Taxonomy 
Along with the closely related Varanus bennetti, it was long considered a population of the mangrove monitor (V. indicus) that had been introduced from the East Indies to smaller Pacific islands by Polynesians to provide a meat supply. However, other scientists maintained that this would not be likely, as the monitors would compete with humans for food, grow slowly, and yield little meat. The presence of a native Chamorro name for the species (hilitai) also indicates that it would have either been present on the islands when they arrived, or the Chamorro would have brought the species with them. Phylogenetic analysis has also affirmed monitors being native to Micronesia, having colonized the islands and diverged from the Varanus indicus species complex during the Late Pleistocene.

Distribution 

It is native to Guam, Cocos Island, Saipan, Rota, Pagan, Tinian, and Anatahan in the Mariana Islands, and is also known from Japtan Island in the Marshall Islands, where it likely originates from a human introduction. An alleged record from the Bonin Islands in Japan is thought to be erroneous.

For unknown reasons, this species is not present on Sarigan Island despite being present on adjacent islands; the monitor species on that island is instead thought to be Bennett's long-tailed monitor (V. bennetti).

Diet 
Mariana monitors in the Southern Mariana Islands shifted major prey classes when their regular prey began declining. The monitors were known for being the top predator on Guam, but the introduction of the brown tree snake (Boiga irregularis) led to a decrease in prey numbers, prompting the monitors to switch to eating invertebrates and foraging through human garbage.

Reproduction 
The species lacks distinct sexual dimorphism, but mature male monitors on Guam have been reported to be three times the mass of mature females.

Relationship with humans 
An ethnic group on Guam eats the monitors as a traditional food, and a business there sells monitors for food. The United States Department of Agriculture’s Animal and Plant Inspection Service announced it will use a combination of two poisons, diphacinone and brodifacoum, to kill off the rodents on  Cocos Island (Guam). They will also attempt to lower the introduced mangrove monitor population on Cocos Island by 80%, using several trapping methods proposed by herpetologist Seamus Ehrhard, as the lizard is believed to prey upon the endangered Guam rail (Gallirallus owstoni). Most locals, however, do not see the monitor as an invasive species and a few activists are opposed to the attempt to lower the population there. This has been further supported by studies showing monitors to be native to Guam.

References

Varanus
Reptiles described in 1929
Taxa named by Kyukichi Kishida
Fauna of the Northern Mariana Islands
Fauna of Guam